Toy of the Year may refer to:

 Toy of the Year award at the American International Toy Fair (US trade fair)
 Toy of the Year award by the Toy Retailers Association (UK trade body)
 Toy of the Year award in Parenting (magazine) (US magazine)
 German Game of the Year award Spiel des Jahres (German board and card game award)
 Speciality Toy of the Year award by the Toy Industry Association (US trade association)